Cullen Douglas (born November 6, 1967) is an American actor, playwright, and screenwriter. His most notable television appearances have come from recurring roles on Pure Genius, Private Practice, Prison Break, Grey's Anatomy, Scandal, and Agents of S.H.I.E.L.D..  His film credits include The Dog Lover (2015), Ace Ventura, Jr.: Pet Detective (2009), Shuttle (2008), Sunshine State (2002) and Love Liza (2002). He had a long, successful stage career before becoming a screen actor.

Early life
Douglas was born in California as Douglas Cullen Baumbach to Dick Baumbach, a newspaper journalist, and Diane (née Taft) Baumbach, a registered nurse.  He lived in six cities across the U.S. as his father got transferred to different locations. He has a younger sister. He attended the American Musical and Dramatic Academy (1986) and the Florida School of the Arts. He returned to FSOTA in 2010 to give their commencement address. He also completed an acting internship with New Stage Theatre in Jackson, Mississippi.

Acting career
Douglas is best known for his television guest appearances on shows such as Prison Break, Private Practice, and Grey’s Anatomy.  His roles have included The Bird Man on ABC’s Grey’s Anatomy and Sapo on FOX’s Prison Break. His other television credits include The Mentalist (2011), CSI: NY (2010), Psych (2010), True Blood (2009), Without a Trace (2008), Criminal Minds (2007), Bones (2006), CSI: Crime Scene Investigation (2006), Charmed (2005) and Six Feet Under (2005).

Douglas's film appearances include Ace Ventura, Jr.: Pet Detective (2009), Shuttle (2008), Sunshine State (2002) and Love Liza (2002).

Douglas has also performed in television commercials for products such as T-Mobile, Kellogg, and FedEx.  He is represented by the firm Greene and Associates.

Writing and stage career
Douglas previously worked as a writer for both Disney and Nickelodeon and was a contributing editor to Ability magazine. He was the first recipient of The Humanitas Organization's "New Voices" initiative, which paired Cullen alongside Shonda Rhimes. He also wrote and continues to perform across the country in the solo play Afraid to Look Down, which explores his journey in becoming a first-time father to son born with Down syndrome.

He wrote the screenplay for Building Bridges as well as co-writing the film Letters to God. For the stage Cullen wrote and stars in the acclaimed and award-winning solo play Afraid to Look Down, which explores the journey he took in becoming a first-time father to a son born with Down syndrome.

Douglas received the "Lillie Stoates," a regional theater award, for Best Supporting Actor in a Play, for his work in The Orlando Theatre Project's "The Lion in Winter."

Filmography

Film
{| class="wikitable sortable"
|-
! Year
! Title
! Role
! class="unsortable" | Notes
|-
|2019
|The Black String
|Man in Black
|
|-
|2015
|The Dog Lover
|Vincent
|Post-production
|-
|2015
|The Adventures of Beatle
|Patient
|
|-
|2014
|The Possession of Michael King
|Mortician
|
|-
|2009
|Deadland
|Nathaniel
|
|-
|2009
|Ace Ventura, Jr.: Pet Detective
|Dr. Sickinger
|TV movie
|-
|2008
|Shuttle
|Andy
|
|-
|2006
|After Midnight: Life Behind Bars
|Larry Burns
|TV movie
|-
|2003
|Small Town Conspiracy
|Hotel Clerk
|
|-
|2002
|Sunshine State'
|Jefferson Cash
|
|-
|2002
|Big Trouble|Fly by Air Captain Justin Hobart
|
|-
|2002
|Love Liza|Cashier at Pancake House
|
|-
|2000
|The Crew|Young Man
|
|-
|1998
|Making Waves|Mr. Perkins
|
|-
|1995
|The Limits of Thermal Traveling|Dennis Hayes
|
|}

Television

Personal life
Douglas met his wife Rachel in Jackson, Mississippi while performing in the musical Eden''.  They married in 1994 and have two sons, Gabriel and Cameron. Gabriel was born with Down syndrome and was diagnosed at age fifteen with Leukemia. They live in Los Angeles, California.

References

External links
Official Site

1967 births
20th-century American male actors
21st-century American male actors
American male film actors
American male television actors
Living people